Allan Niblo  is a British film producer and director.

He co-founded Vertigo Films in 2002.

Filmography

Producer 
 Monsters: Dark Continent (2014)
 Monsters (2010)
 Outlaw (2007)
 WΔZ (2007)
 The Business (2005)
 It's All Gone Pete Tong (2004)
 The Football Factory (2004)
 South West 9 (2001)
 Human Traffic (1999)

Executive producer 
 The Facility (2012)
 Horrid Henry: The Movie (2011)
 The Wake Wood (2011)
 Dirty Sanchez: The Movie (2006)

Awards 
 BAFTA – Cymru Award

Nominations 
 Genie Award – Best Motion Picture for It's All Gone Pete Tong
 Leo Award –  Feature Length Drama: Best Feature Length Drama for It's All Gone Pete Tong

References

External links
 

British film directors
British film producers
Living people
Year of birth missing (living people)